Elk Grove is a city in Sacramento County, California, United States. Located just south of the state capital of Sacramento, it is part of the Sacramento–Arden-Arcade–Roseville Metropolitan Statistical Area. As of the 2020 Census, the population of the city was 176,124. A 2021 Census estimate puts the population of the city at 178,997. Elk Grove has many wineries, wine cellars, and vineyards. Elk Grove was the fastest-growing city in the U.S. between July 1, 2004, and July 1, 2005, and is also presently the second-largest city in Sacramento County by population.

The City of Elk Grove became the first city in California to be incorporated in the 21st century. It is a general law city with a council/manager form of government. One of Elk Grove's largest employers is the Elk Grove Unified School District, which is the city's second largest employer.

History
Spanish explorer Gabriel Moraga entered the region in 1808, naming the valley "Sacramento Valley" in honor of Sacramento, the Holy Sacrament in Spanish, giving the northerly city of Sacramento its name. A writer on Moraga's expedition wrote of the region: 
"Canopies of oaks and cottonwoods, many festooned with grapevines, overhung both sides of the blue current. Birds chattered in the trees and big fish darted through the pellucid depths. The air was like champagne, and (the Spaniards) drank deep of it, drank in the beauty around them."

Elk Grove was founded in 1850 as a stage stop for travelers coming from Sacramento and the San Francisco Bay Area, when the Elk Grove Hotel and Stage Stop was opened by James Hall and the town was named after it. In 1868 the Western Division of the Central Pacific Railroad came through about a mile east of Elk Grove. At this new location another hotel was built to accommodate travelers and was named the Elk Grove Hotel.

In the following decades, Elk Grove remained a small farming community with little urban development. In the late 1980s, suburban development projects began to spring up around the community, specifically in the north near Sacramento. These were meant to serve Sacramento's population, as well as San Francisco commuters seeking a commuting community relatively near the San Francisco Bay Area where they could reside. Such changes triggered a period of rapid growth. On July 1, 2000, Elk Grove incorporated as a city. The city's growth peaked in 2004 and 2005, when Elk Grove was declared the fastest growing city in the US.

Apple Inc. manufactured its iMac line in Elk Grove as late as 2002. After many of those tasks were offshored in 2004, the facility was converted into the modern Apple Elk Grove campus. In 2018, Apple invested $4.2 million into expanding the office space, expanding its already established AppleCare support presence in the region.

In 2008, Elk Grove suffered heavily from the subprime mortgage crisis due to its suburban nature.

Demographics

Education
The Elk Grove Unified School District is the fifth largest school district in California and one of the fastest growing school districts in the nation. It also consistently ranks among the top school districts in the state. For the 2002–03 school year, the district served more than 52,500 students, and grew to 62,767 students in the 2016–2017 school year. Those students attend 40 elementary schools, 9 middle schools, 9 high schools and 7 alternative high schools.

There are also several private schools in town. A local community college, Cosumnes River College, offers both career training and a transfer program to four-year universities, such as the CSU system and UC system across the state of California. Located nearby are California State University, Sacramento and the University of California, Davis. Elk Grove is also the home of the private six-year Universalist college Quest Seminary. In 2013, California Northstate University College of Pharmacy, which offers a Doctor of Pharmacy degree program, relocated to Elk Grove (near Interstate 5).

Climate
Elk Grove is 5 – 10 miles south of the state capital in Sacramento and experiences a hot-summer Mediterranean climate (Köppen Csa) with hot summers and cool winters. Summers are moderated by a cool Pacific Ocean breeze also known as the "delta breeze" which comes through the Sacramento–San Joaquin River Delta from the San Francisco Bay.

Public libraries
The Elk Grove Public Library is located at 8900 Elk Grove Boulevard in a modern two-story building. It moved to this location in 2008 from its old building one block east. The library is part of the broader Sacramento Public Library system. The Elk Grove Library also serves neighboring communities such as Vineyard, Wilton, Sloughhouse, and Rancho Murieta.
Additional local libraries supplement neighborhoods, such as the public Franklin High Library.

Government
Beginning in 2012, voters elect the mayor for a two-year term. Prior to 2012, the mayor's position was a one-year term and was chosen by the city council.  The remaining four positions on the city council are elected by districts to four-year terms.

On November 8, 2016, Steve Ly became the second one directly elected mayor following Gary Davis. He is the first ethnic Hmong mayor in the United States, having come here at the age of four with his family as refugees from Laos after the end of the Vietnam War. Currently, Bobbie Singh-Allen sits as mayor defeating Ly in the 2020 election following Ly's controversial tenure. The remaining councilmembers are Darren Suen (District 1), Rod Brewer (District 2), Kevin Spease (District 3) and Sergio Robles (District 4).

The Cosumnes Community Services District is the largest Community Services District in California and provides parks and recreation services and fire protection services in Elk Grove. Located in southern Sacramento County, the district covers .The board of directors is the governing body of the district and is composed of five duly-elected or appointed residents. At the beginning of each year, the board selects from its members a president and vice-president to serve during the ensuing year.

Economy

Employers

Infrastructure

Buses
Elk Grove is serviced by a fared bus system called E-tran that traverses many of the city's main routes.

Parks
Cosumnes Community Services District owns and operates over 100 parks in Elk Grove, including Emerald Lakes Golf Course.

Rail
There are plans for SacRT to expand its light rail system two miles south from Cosumnes River College to Elk Grove Boulevard, however these plans for a new light-rail station are currently in the planning phase.
Amtrak California San Joaquin intercity rail and Altamont Corridor Express commuter rail were expected to be brought directly to Elk Grove in 2021, on the existing rail line which extends from Marysville in the north to Stockton in the south. However, that project has been delayed due to the COVID-19 pandemic and the ongoing wildfires throughout the state.

Sister cities
Elk Grove is a sister city of Concepción de Ataco in El Salvador.

Notable people

Arik Armstead (born 1993), defensive lineman for NFL's San Francisco 49ers
Armond Armstead (born 1990), defensive tackle for CFL's Toronto Argonauts
Ami Bera (born 1965), physician; U.S. Representative, 7th district, California
Scott Boras (born 1952), baseball sports agent who was named "Most Powerful Sports Agent" in 2013 by Forbes
Lance Briggs (born 1980), linebacker for NFL's Chicago Bears
Ally Carda, 2020 Tokyo Silver Medalist in softball
Dylan Carlson (baseball) (born 1998), outfielder for the St. Louis Cardinals
Bill Cartwright (born 1957), player and coach for NBA's Chicago Bulls
Cody Demps (born 1993), basketball player for Hapoel Be'er Sheva of the Israeli Basketball Premier League
Earl Gage Jr. (ca. 1927–2017), firefighter
Kyle Larson (born 1992), NASCAR driver and 2021 NASCAR Cup Series champion
Jeremy Reeves, Grammy winning producer
Scott Smith (born 1979), mixed martial artist
Tyler, the Creator (born 1991) rapper, songwriter, record producer
Kenny Wiggins, lineman for NFL's Detroit Lions
 Matt Manning, Baseball player
 Riley Voelkel (born 1990), actress

References

External links

 

 
Cities in Sacramento County, California
Cities in Sacramento metropolitan area
Cosumnes River
Geography of the Sacramento Valley
Former census-designated places in California
Incorporated cities and towns in California
Populated places established in 1850
1850 establishments in California